The following lists events that happened during 1967 in Cape Verde.

Incumbents
Colonial governor:
Leão Maria Tavares Rosado do Sacramento Monteiro

Events

Sports
Académica do Mindelo won the Cape Verdean Football Championship

Births
January 30: Toni Duarte, footballer

References

 
1967 in the Portuguese Empire
Years of the 20th century in Cape Verde
1960s in Cape Verde
Cape Verde
Cape Verde